Maarit Toivanen (previously Toivanen-Koivisto; b. 27 December 1954, Helsinki) is a Finnish business executive and investor, notable for being only the second woman to receive Finland's highest civilian honorary title of Vuorineuvos.

Early life and education
Maarit Toivanen was born as the youngest daughter of the family owning the Finnish building materials wholesaler , which had been set up in 1913 by her great-grandfather, Alfred Onninen.

She was raised in the upmarket Ullanlinna district of Helsinki, and was privately educated, graduating from the Mannerheimintien Yhteiskoulu secondary school in 1973.

Following some post-secondary business studies in Finland, Toivanen went on to study economics and finance at Uppsala University in Sweden, graduating in 1978.

Business career
After her studies, Toivanen joined the family business, and over the years worked in various functions including sales, purchasing, product management, quality and finance.

Following the death in 2000 of her father, Erkki J. Toivanen, who had run the business for 35 years, Maarit Toivanen took on the role of Chairperson of Onninen, as well as CEO of its parent group . She represented the fourth generation of her family to run the business, and continued to do so until the sale of most of the group operations to Kesko in 2016 for a reported EUR 369 million.

In addition to the family business, Toivanen has served in Board roles at several notable Finnish listed companies, including Neste, Itella and Rautaruukki, as well as in a number of cultural and civic organisations such as Sibelius Academy and Alvar Aalto Museum.

Honours
In 2008, Toivanen was granted the honorary title of Vuorineuvos by President Tarja Halonen. She was only the second woman in Finnish history to receive the honour.

In 2011, she was conferred an honorary doctorate in economic sciences by Aalto University.

Controversies
Toivanen caused controversy in 2014, when she announced that she would be moving her and her family's tax domicile to Portugal the following year, in preparation for the impending company sale, in order to avoid Finland's 20% inheritance tax which she considered too high. She returned to Finland in 2018.

The large amount is due to the Finnish 'day-fine' system whereby speeding tickets are not fixed, but depend instead on the offender's income.

Personal life
Maarit Toivanen has been married twice. She has two children from her first marriage. From her second marriage, to Ilkka Koivisto (m. 1994 — div. 2017), she also has two children, as well as two step-children from Koivisto's earlier marriage.

References

Finnish business executives
Finnish chief executives
Women business executives
Businesspeople from Helsinki
1954 births
Uppsala University alumni
Living people